The Afrikaner Volksfront (AVF) was a separatist umbrella organisation uniting a number of right-wing Afrikaner organisations in South Africa in the early 1990s.

History  
The AVF was formed by General Constand Viljoen and three other generals from the South African Defence Force (SADF), and launched on 7 May 1993. The other three generals were Major General Tienie Groenewald, a former chief of military intelligence, Lieutenant General Koos Bischoff, former chief of operations of the SADF, and Lieutenant General Cobus Visser, a former head of investigations of the South African Police.  The AVF President was Dr Ferdi Hartzenberg, leader of the Conservative Party, and the chief secretary was Colonel Piet Botha.

The AVF existed as an umbrella group for right wing groups rather than a party in itself. Other groups involved included the Boerestaat Party, the Herstigte Nasionale Party, and the Oranjewerkers. The AVF aimed to disrupt the 1994 elections.

The AVF established a Volksrepubliek werkkomitee ("People's Republic working committee") to gather information and put the ideal of Afrikaner self-determination into practice. In September 1993 this committee recommended a Volkstaat solution incorporating Pretoria, parts of the Transvaal, and northern Kimberley and Northern Natal, which would exist as a state with the right to secede from a federal South Africa; in November 1994 a new proposal was suggested for a smaller state with just autonomy.  The negotiations held with the ANC displeased hardliners within the AVF, with Hartzenberg demanding nothing less than an independent Afrikaner homeland.  After negotiations failed Viljoen's position in the AVF was undermined by the hardliners; Viljoen left and subsequently formed the Freedom Front. The AVF rejected the interim constitution of South Africa which was passed in November 1993.

In 1994 the AVF sought to have the Boers recognised as an indigenous people by the United Nations but were unsuccessful after 82 other indigenous peoples signed a petition against the AVF's participation. The AVF also participated in the 1994 Bophuthatswana crisis in which several members of the Afrikaner Weerstandsbeweging were killed.

The AVF was disbanded in November 1996.

References

External links
First Report of the Volk's Republic Works Committee of the Afrikaner Volksfront

1993 establishments in South Africa
1996 disestablishments in South Africa
Afrikaner nationalism
Boer nationalism
Defunct political parties in South Africa
Far-right politics in South Africa
Nationalist parties in South Africa
Organisations associated with apartheid
Political parties disestablished in 1996
Political parties established in 1993
Political party alliances in South Africa